FLISoL, an acronym for Festival Latinoamericano de Instalación de Software Libre (Latin American free software install fest), is the biggest event for spreading Software Libre since 2005, performed simultaneously in different countries of Latin America. In 2012, more than 290 cities from 20 countries of Latin America participated on a FLISoL.

This festival is an opportunity for all those people interested on know more about Software Libre. Getting involved makes it possible to get in touch with the world of Software Libre, meet other users, resolve doubts and questions, exchange opinions and experiences, attend to informative talks and others activities.

Objective
Introduce Software Libre by its most known representative: Linux; or by installing Software Libre like LibreOffice, GIMP, Firefox and many more. During the event, operating systems or other free alternatives are installed for free to people who want to on their computers.

Also talks are given along with papers and workshops about local, national and Latin American topics related to Software Libre and its movement.

Is important to know, that the objective itself is to create a link and promote migration between the users (newbies and advanced) and Software Libre.

Countries involved

Argentina
Bolivia
Brazil
Chile
Colombia
Costa Rica
Cuba
Dominican Republic
Ecuador
El Salvador
Guatemala
Honduras
México
Nicaragua
Panamá
Paraguay
Perú
Spain
Uruguay
Venezuela

See also

 Free software community
 Free software licenses
 Gratis versus Libre
 Libre knowledge
 Free content
 Free file format
 Open standards
 List of free software packages
 List of free software project directories
 List of formerly proprietary software

References

External links

Official Website

Free-software events
Linux conferences